The Ukraine women's national under-19 football team represents Ukraine women in international football in the UEFA Women's Under-19 Championship and finals of the FIFA World Youth Championship (under-20). It is controlled by Football Federation of Ukraine, the governing body for football in Ukraine.

Current Team

See also 
 Ukraine (Senior) team

References

External links
Uefa Under-19 website Contains full results archive

Women's national under-19 association football teams
Women uUnder-19
Youth football in Ukraine